Hulme Hall Grammar School is a co-educational school in Stockport, Greater Manchester, England. Established in 1928, there is a Pre-School and Senior School on site. It has an average of around 50 new pupils each year. The current Headmaster is Mr Dean Grierson, The Deputy Heads are; Mr Philip Bradford and Mrs Jackie Smith. The school's motto is 'Seek Truth'.

Moving Site 
During the 2016-2017 Academic Year, the school’s governing body announced that the school would be moving to the old Hillcrest Grammar School site, which was originally the site of Stockport High School for Girls. Hulme Hall opened on the new site in September 2017 and the school is in the process of updating its facilities.

References

External links

Educational institutions established in 1928
Private schools in the Metropolitan Borough of Stockport
Stockport
1928 establishments in England